Khorolsky District is an administrative and municipal district (raion), one of the twenty-two in Primorsky Krai, Russia. It is located in the southwest of the krai. Its administrative center is the rural locality (a selo) of Khorol. Population:  The population of Khorol accounts for 35.9% of the district's total population.

History
The district was established on January 25, 1935.

References

Notes

Sources

Districts of Primorsky Krai
States and territories established in 1935
